Nardostachys jatamansi is a flowering plant of the valerian family that grows in the Himalayas. It is a source of a type of intensely aromatic amber-colored essential oil, spikenard. The oil has, since ancient times, been used as a perfume, as a traditional medicine, and in religious ceremonies. It is also called spikenard, nard, nardin, or muskroot. It is considered endangered due to overharvesting for folk medicine, overgrazing, loss of habitats, and forest degradation.

Description
Nardostachys jatamansi is a flowering plant of the honeysuckle family that grows in the eastern Himalayas, primarily in a belt through Kumaon, Nepal, Sikkim and Bhutan. The plant grows  in height and has pink, bell-shaped flowers. Rhizomes (underground stems) can be crushed and distilled into an intensely aromatic amber-colored essential oil, which is very thick in consistency. Nard oil is used as a perfume, an incense, a sedative, and an herbal medicine said to fight insomnia, birth difficulties, and other minor ailments.

Phytochemistry
Preliminary research on the chemical components of Nardostachys jatamansi indicates the plant contains:

acaciin
ursolic acid
octacosanol
kanshone A
nardosinonediol
nardosinone
aristolen-9beta-ol
oleanolic acid
beta-sitosterol

In spikenard

Nardostachys jatamansi may have been used as an ingredient in the incense known as spikenard, although lavender has also been suggested as a candidate for the spikenard of classical times.

References

External links

 Original botanical description by David Don from Prodromus Florae Nepalensis (1825), in Latin (archived by the Biodiversity Heritage Library)

Valerianoideae
Flora of Tibet
Perfume ingredients
Spices
Incense material
Flora of Nepal